Idro may refer to:

Places, Italy
 Idro, Lombardy, a comune in the Province of Brescia
 Lake Idro (or Lago d’Idro), a subalpine lake in the Provinces of Brescia and Trento

Organisations
 IDRO, Industrial Development and Renovation Organization of Iran
 IDRO, Internal Dobrujan Revolutionary Organisation

People
 Richard Idro, a Ugandan pediatric neurologist.